Kerkhof is a Dutch toponymic surname meaning "church garden”, Pronounced Kerik-hof.  Largely a historically Catholic name in the Netherlands. Alternative spellings include: Kerekhoff, Kerkhoff, Van Kerkhof. 

An ancestor may have lived near or worked in the church yard, or have come from a number of villages and hamlets named Kerkhove or Kerkhoven. Among variant forms of the surname are Kerckhoff(s), Kerkhoff(s), Kerkhove(n), and Van (de) Kerkhof(f).  Notable people with the surname include:

Ian Kerkhof (since 1999 Aryan Kaganof; born 1964), South African-Dutch film maker, novelist, and poet
Louis-Joseph Kerkhofs (1878–1962), Roman Catholic bishop
Nikki Kerkhof (born 1983), Dutch singer
Tim Kerkhof (born 1993), Dutch racing cyclist
Kerkhoff(s)
Bernd Kerkhoff (fl. 1975), German rower
Guido Kerkhoff (born 1967), German business executive
Pierre Kerkhoffs (1936–2021), Dutch football striker
Van Kerkhof
Bram van Kerkhof (born 1948), Dutch football midfielder and manager
Sanne van Kerkhof (born 1987), Dutch short track speed skater, sister of Yara
Yara van Kerkhof (born 1990), Dutch short-track speed-skater, sister of Sanne
Van de(n) Kerkhof
Kevin Van Den Kerkhof (born 1996), French professional footballer
René van de Kerkhof (born 1951), Dutch football winger, twin brother of Willy
Willy van de Kerkhof (born 1951), Dutch footballer midfielder, twin brother of René

See also
John Kerkhof Park, a venue for football matches in Cambridge, New Zealand, named after the Dutch immigrant former president of the Cambridge Football Club

References

Dutch-language surnames
Toponymic surnames